The Kadıköy Ferry Terminal, also known as the Kadıköy İDO Terminal, is a ferry terminal in Kadıköy, Istanbul, located near Damga Street on the Bosporus strait. It is one of four ferry landings within Kadıköy Harbor. İDO operates seabus ferries to Yenikapı, Bakırköy and Bostancı in Istanbul, as well as to destinations across the Marmara Sea.

Kadıköy Terminal was opened in 1992, as part of the Metropolitan Municipality's expansion of the İDO system.

References

Ferry piers in Istanbul
1992 establishments in Turkey
Transport in Kadıköy